Zhang Zhen may refer to:

 Zhang Zhen (Qing dynasty), Chinese scholar of the Qing period
Zhang Zhen (general) (1914–2015), Chinese general of the People's Liberation Army
Zhang Zhen (diplomat, born 1930), former Chinese ambassador to Ukraine
Zhang Zhen (diplomat, born 1936), former Chinese ambassador to Jordan and Syria
Chang Chen or Zhang Zhen (born 1976), Taiwanese actor
Zhang Zhen (athlete) (born 1984), Chinese Paralympics gold medallist
Zhang Zhen (章贞), professor in Uppsala University.